Fame Factory was a Swedish reality television show structured in the form of Star Academy series also known under that name (Star Academy) in France or various names like Fame Academy in the UK, Operación Triunfo in Spain etc. 

Fame Factory was launched in 2002 on the Swedish channel TV3 and was hosted for 4 seasons by Bert Karlsson. For all seasons, the Academy was held at Skara with the final each year held at various location: at Paroc-fabriken in Skövde for season 1 (2002), at the Olssons Lada also in Skövde for season 2 won by (2003), at Hovet in Stockholm season 3 (2004, in two legs, winter and spring) and the Skara market town (season for in 2005). 

The instructors for the Academy school was Mikael Gordon-Solfors and the program was produced by the Swedish production company Strix and by Joachim Janckert. The principals for the academy were Micke Grahn (for season 1 and first leg of season 3), Monica Einarson (for season 2), Bengt Palmers (for second leg of season 3) and Lotta Engberg (season 4). The program was suspended after 4 seasons. 

Winners were Magnus Bäcklund in season 1 in 2002, Anders Johansson in season 2 in 2003, Johan Becker in season 3 (2004) and Sandra Oxenryd in the final season 4 (2005).

The winner of season 1 Magnus Bäcklund was paired with contestant Jessica Andersson to form the duo Fame. The duo won the Melodifestivalen 2003 and represented Sweden in the Eurovision Song Contest 2003 with "Give Me Your Love" finishing fifth in the competition, while the winner of season 4, Sandra Oxenryd, represented Estonia in the Eurovision Song Contest 2006 but failed to qualify for the final.

Contestants

Season 1 (2002)
Magnus Bäcklund (winner) 
Jessica Andersson
Andrés Esteche
Anna-Klara Folin
Fernando Fuentes Vargas
Mathias Holmgren
Markus Landgren
Victoria Limenza
David Lindgren
Michael Michailoff
Wiktoria Nilsson
Maria Pensar
Patrik Rasmussen
Emil Sigfridsson
Hannah Westin

Season 2 (2003)
Anders Johansson (Winner)
Johanna Bjurenstedt Gustafsson
David Castaneda
Simon Forsberg
Ida Hedberg
Morgan Johansson
Sophie Johansson
Ulrika Lundkvist
Mia Löfgren
Dajana Lööf
Martin Nilsson
Per Norberg
Dennis Radoicic
Peter Simson
Jerker Tenenbaum
Johan Thorsell

Season 3 (2003)
Held in two legs (winter and spring)
Johan Becker (Winner)
Theresa Andréasson
Sabina Baltzar-Roth
Calle Bergström
Johan Bergström
Sandra Dahlberg 
Martina Edoff
Elena Ermanova
Fredrik Furu
Maja Gullstrand 
Elin Hedberg
Pauline Högberg
Jimmy Jansson 
Sara Löfgren 
Karl Martindahl (runner-up)
Andreas Martinelle
Annie Nordin
Andreas Novak
Martin Olsen
Katja Ottosson
Modupeh Sowe 
Carola Szücs 
Andreas Wistrand
Robert Zuddas
Marcus Öhrn
Johan Östberg (third)

Season 4 (2005)
Sandra Oxenryd (Winner)
Pontus Assarsson (finalist)
Linda Bengtzing
Andrea Bonde
Annis Brander
Camilla Håkansson
Andreas Johansson
Emma Karlsson (finalist)
Victoria Limenza
Anders Nystedt
Jessica Olsson
Mikaela Pettersson
Ida Pihlgren (finalist)
Johanna Sailon
Alexander Schöld
Staffan Stridsberg
Ida Sundelius
Patrik Öhlund (finalist)

Music competitions in Sweden
TV3 (Sweden) original programming
2002 Swedish television series debuts
2005 Swedish television series endings
2000s Swedish television series
Swedish reality television series